Marko Ahosilta (born January 24, 1980) is a Finnish former professional ice hockey left wing.  He played in the SM-liiga for KalPa. He was drafted 227th overall by the New Jersey Devils in the 1998 NHL Entry Draft.

External links

1980 births
Living people
Finnish ice hockey left wingers
Hokki players
Iisalmen Peli-Karhut players
Jokipojat players
KalPa players
People from Kuopio
New Jersey Devils draft picks
SaPKo players
Sportspeople from North Savo